Payson Alton Sherman (August 14, 1889 – October 5, 1977) was a Canadian politician and a two-term Member of the Legislative Assembly of Quebec.

Background

He was born in Scotstown, Quebec on August 14, 1889 and married Margaret Muir in New Hampshire in 1914.

Member of the legislature

Sherman ran as a Conservative candidate in the provincial district of Compton in the 1935 election and won against Liberal incumbent William James Duffy.

He joined Maurice Duplessis's Union Nationale and was re-elected in the 1936 election. He did not run for re-election in the 1939 election.

Mayor

He served as school board member, city councillor and from 1947 to 1957 Mayor of Hampden, Quebec in the Eastern Townships.

Retirement

He co-founded the Compton County Historical Society in 1959 and died on October 5, 1977.

References

1889 births
1977 deaths
Mayors of places in Quebec
Conservative Party of Quebec MNAs
People from Estrie
Union Nationale (Quebec) MNAs